The Men's 10 metre platform diving event is one of 261 events in 17 disciplines at the 2014 Commonwealth Games. It was held on August 2, 2014. Tom Daley of England won the gold medal, Ooi Tze Liang of Malaysia won the silver medal and Vincent Riendeau of Canada won the Bronze madal.

Schedule
All times are British Summer Time (UTC+1)

Format
The divers were to compete in a preliminary round, with each diver making six dives. The 12 best divers were to advance to the final round during the evening session, where all previous scores would be cleared. However, since there were only 11 divers in the competition all the divers progressed to the final, with the preliminary round only serving to determine the order in which they dived in the final.

Results
Green denotes finalists

References

Diving at the 2014 Commonwealth Games